Army Public School, Mumbai is a public school located in Colaba, Mumbai, India. It is run under Indian Army supervision and is part of the Army Public School network. Army Schools are located in Indian communities in and around Army installations. The school's current principal is Mrs. Vipanjot Sehdeva. The school also a student council , which is elected every year through a three tier process of elections and is responsible for maintaining discipline in the school.

Extracurricular activities
These include English Week, Hindi Week and the celebration of important festivals. Inter-house activities include recitation, slogan-writing, essay writing, poster-making, calligraphy, drawing and quiz competitions.

Inter-house competitions in games like football, cricket, basketball, and kho-kho are held. Mass P.T, drill marching and training for outdoor and indoor games is provided. Students have participated in interscholastic contests like cross-country race, interscholastic football competition, and athletic meets.

References

External links
Army School Mumbai

Indian Army Public Schools
Schools in Mumbai